Kalateh-ye Mohammad Reza Khan (also Romanized as Kalāteh-ye Moḩammad Reẕā Khān; also known as Moḩammad Reẕā Khān) is a village in Faruj Rural District, in the Central District of Faruj County, North Khorasan Province, Iran. At the 2006 census, its population was 349, in 80 families.

References 

Populated places in Faruj County